Cornus drummondii, commonly known as the roughleaf dogwood, is a small deciduous tree that is native primarily to the Great Plains and Midwestern regions of the United States. It is also found around the Mississippi River. It is uncommon in the wild, and is mostly found around forest borders. The roughleaf dogwood is used as a buffer strip around parking lots, in the median of highways and near the decks and patios of homes. It can grow to a height of 15 to 25 feet (4.6 - 7.6 m) with a spread of 10 to 15 feet (3.1 - 4.6 m). The roughleaf dogwood flowers during the summer months. It produces near-white four-petaled flowers that are followed by small white fruits, which ripen from August to October. These dogwoods can form a dense thicket that is used as cover for wildlife. Over forty species of birds are known to feed on the fruits.

References

External links

drummondii
Plants described in 1845
Trees of the Eastern United States
Trees of the Plains-Midwest (United States)
Trees of the North-Central United States